Debutantes is a young adult mystery novel series by Jennifer Lynn Barnes. The series consist of two books: Little White Lies (2018) and Deadly Little Scandals (2019).

Little White Lies 
Little White Lies was published November 6, 2018 by Freeform. The book received positive reviews from Publishers Weekly, Booklist, and Kirkus Reviews.

Deadly Little Scandals 
Deadly Little Scandals was published November 5, 2019 by Little, Brown Books for Young Readers. The book received positive reviews from Booklist and Kirkus Reviews.

References 

Little, Brown and Company books
Book series introduced in 2018